The Inner Man is a 1922 American silent comedy film directed by Hamilton Smith and starring Wyndham Standing, J. Barney Sherry and Dorothy Mackaill.

Cast
 Wyndham Standing as Thurlow Michael Barclay Jr
 J. Barney Sherry as Thurlow Michael Barclay Sr
 Louis Pierce as Old Man Wolf
 Leslie Hunt as Bob
 Dorothy Mackaill as Sally
 Gustav von Seyffertitz as Jud Benson
 Arthur Dewey as Randall
 Martin Kinney as Ned Sawyer
 Kathryn Kingsley as Margaret Barclay
 Nellie Parker Spaulding as Mrs. Wolf
 Arthur Cadwell Jr. as Ben Wolf

References

Bibliography
 Munden, Kenneth White. The American Film Institute Catalog of Motion Pictures Produced in the United States, Part 1. University of California Press, 1997.

External links
 

1922 films
1922 comedy films
1920s English-language films
American silent feature films
Silent American comedy films
American black-and-white films
Films directed by Hamilton Smith
1920s American films